Chiang Peng-chien (25 April 1940 – 15 December 2000) was a Taiwanese politician who was a co-founder and the first chairperson of the Democratic Progressive Party. Chiang was elected a member of the Legislative Yuan in 1983 and became a member of the Control Yuan in 1996.

Early life 
Chiang Peng-chien was born April 25, 1940, in Daitōtei, Taihoku Prefecture, Japanese-era Taiwan. His father was a shoemaker from Fujian, China.

In 1955, Chiang entered the Taipei Municipal Jianguo High School. He was then accepted to National Taiwan University, majoring in law. After graduation, he passed the bar examination in 1964. Chiang began practicing law after earning his master's degree.

Chiang founded the Taiwan Association for Human Rights. On Human Rights Day in 1979, members of the Formosa Magazine and other Tangwai pro-democracy advocates went on a demonstration. Many of the participants were arrested by the government and tried in military court. Chiang defended Lin Yi-hsiung, one of the Kaohsiung Eight.

Political career 
Chiang became involved in politics and supported the Tangwai movement. He was elected a member of the Legislative Yuan in 1983. In September 1986, about 130 pro-democracy advocates, including Chiang, gathered at the Grand Hotel in Taipei to establish the Democratic Progressive Party (DPP). On November 10, 1986, he was elected the first chairperson of the party.

In 1994, Chiang was a candidate for the DPP's nomination in the 1994 Taipei mayoral election. He competed against legislators Chen Shui-bian and Frank Hsieh and lost. He returned to the Legislative Yuan in January 1995, replacing David Hou as an at-large legislator on the DPP party list. In 1996, Chiang became a member of the Control Yuan. He worked to prevent any activities associated with black gold and actively investigated sensitive cases involved with former political oppression.

Death and legacy 
Chiang died in December 2000 of pancreatic cancer. His widow Peng Feng-mei donated his writings and books to the Academia Historia for display.

References 

1940 births
2000 deaths
Democratic Progressive Party chairpersons
Taipei Members of the Legislative Yuan
National Taiwan University alumni
Taiwanese democracy activists
Taiwanese human rights activists
Taiwanese people of Hoklo descent
Democratic Progressive Party Members of the Legislative Yuan
Members of the 1st Legislative Yuan in Taiwan
Deaths from pancreatic cancer
Party List Members of the Legislative Yuan
Deaths from cancer in Taiwan
Taiwanese political party founders
Taiwanese Members of the Control Yuan
Members of the 2nd Legislative Yuan